Frederick J. Amsden was an architect from Scranton, Pennsylvania. He was a veteran of the Civil War with the rank of captain. He was born at Rome, New York, on June 19, 1841, but his father, Joel Amsden, relocated to Scranton in 1850. Frederick J. Amsden died at Scranton on June 5, 1906.

Principal Architectural Works
 First Central High School, Plymouth, Pennsylvania (built 1884).
 St. Vincent's Church, Plymouth, Pennsylvania (cornerstone 1882; dedicated 1887).
 Town Hall, Plymouth, Pennsylvania (completed 1891).
 Willow Street School, Plymouth, Pennsylvania (completed 1892).
 Rectory, St. Vincent's Church, Plymouth, Pennsylvania (completed 1893).
 St. Stephen's Church, Plymouth, Pennsylvania (dedicated 1894; demolished 1953).
 St. Leo's Church, Ashley, Pennsylvania (cornerstone 1890; dedicated 1897).

Gallery

See also
Architecture of Plymouth, Pennsylvania

External links

References

Architects from Pennsylvania
19th-century American architects
1841 births
1906 deaths
People from Scranton, Pennsylvania